Eugene N. Borza (3 March 1935 – 5 September 2021) was a professor emeritus of ancient history at Pennsylvania State University, where he taught from 1964 until 1995.

Academic career
Born in Cleveland, Ohio, USA, Borza came from a family of immigrants from Romania.  Borza wrote extensively on the ancient kingdom of Macedonia, his most notable publication In the Shadow of Olympus (1990, Princeton). He was a guest lecturer for the In the introductory chapter of Makedonika by Carol G. Thomas, Borza is characterized as a "Macedonian specialist". He has also been called the dean of US scholars on ancient Macedonia, and served as president of the Association of Ancient Historians for six years, from 1984 to 1989, and was a national lecturer for the Archaeological Institute of America (AIA) for 40 years. He was appointed as visiting professor at the University of Colorado, Boulder; The American School of Classical Studies at Athens; the University of Washington; Trinity University; and Carlton College. He especially enjoyed serving as historical advisor to the National Gallery of Art's groundbreaking exhibition, The Search for Alexander, in 1981.

Views 

Like a number of other experts on ancient Macedonia, specifically Ernst Badian and Peter Green, (sometimes grouped together as Badian-Green-Borza) doubted that the ancient Macedonians were Greek. Borza wriote that: "they may or may not have been Greek in whole or in part—while an interesting anthropological sidelight—is really not crucial to our understanding of their history" and that they "may have had Greek origins" (through proto-Greek populations), but that "the Macedonians emerged as a people recognized as distinct from their Greek and Balkan neighbors". Simon Hornblower summarizes: "Borza's answer to the sub-question 'were they Greeks?' is 'yes and no'; what he insists on is that the Macedonians saw themselves as distinct".

Borza also noted that the ancient Macedonians were not related to the modern ethnic Macedonians. Per Borza, the modern-day ethnic Macedonians, are a recently emergent people in search of their past.

His views and skepticism on the ethnicity of the ancient Macedonians, rejected by the Greek government, led to the Greek refusal to allow him to film with British historian Michael Wood for the 1998 BBC television series In the Footsteps of Alexander the Great inside Greece.

In 2008, he received a festschrift published in his honor. His works have received both praise and criticism from a variety of scholars.

Published works
 1962 – The Bacaudae: A Study of Rebellion in Late Roman Gaul (University of Chicago, Department of History)
 1974 – The Impact of Alexander the Great (Dryden Press)
 1972 – "Fire from heaven: Alexander at Persepolis" Classical Philology 67, 233–245.
 1982 – "The natural resources of early Macedonia" in W. L. Adams and E. N. Borza, eds. Philip II, Alexander the Great, and the Macedonian Heritage. Lanham, MD. 1–20.
 1983 – "The symposium at Alexander's court" Archaia Makedonia 3, 45–55
 1990 – In the Shadow of Olympus: The Emergence of Macedon (Princeton University Press)
 1995 – Makedonika (Regina Books)
 1999 – "Macedonia Redux" in Frances B. Titchener and Richard F. Moorton, eds. The Eye Expanded: Life and Arts in Greco-Roman Antiquity De Gruyter, 249-65.

References

External links
 

1935 births
2021 deaths
Pennsylvania State University faculty
American people of Romanian descent
Writers from Cleveland
Historians from Ohio
American male non-fiction writers
20th-century American historians
20th-century American male writers